is a Japanese multinational information technology (IT) service and consulting company headquartered in Tokyo, Japan. It is a partially-owned subsidiary of Nippon Telegraph and Telephone (NTT).

Japan Telegraph and Telephone Public Corporation, a predecessor of NTT, started Data Communications business in 1967. NTT, following its privatization in 1985, spun off the Data Communications division as NTT DATA in 1988, which has now become the largest of the IT Services companies headquartered in Japan.

History

2000s
In 2002, it was the first Japanese company to obtain BS 7799 certification, an international information security standard. In 2007, the company had consolidated net sales of ¥1 trillion, and in 2008 the company acquired German-based Cirquent, Inc. A new organizational structure of the "Company System" was introduced in 2009. Also that year, the company acquired Extend Technologies Pty Ltd in Australia, as part of a strategy to expand the global footprint of specialised SAP consulting businesses

NTT DATA and US-based IT Service company Keane agreed to a merger on 29 October 2010. The acquisition is worth over US$1.23 billion. After the acquisition of Keane Inc., NTT DATA became the 8th largest software company in the world, with the annual revenue of $14 billion. Acquiring Keane Inc. in 2010 increased the Group's total work force to 50,000. That year the company also acquired FirstApex, increasing the business footprint in insurance domain. In 2010, NTT DATA acquired Intelligroup Inc., a US-based IT consulting and service providing company. After taking over Intelligroup, NTT DATA became the ninth largest software company in the world, worth over $11 billion. India-based Intelligroup, Inc is headquartered at iLabs, Madhapur, Hyderabad.

2011–present

In 2011, the company acquired Italy-based Value Team S.p.A. and launched Global One Teams. In 2012 the company acquired London-based Design and Technology Consultancy, RMA Consulting, who specialize in software design and delivery across multiple channels.

In 2013, the company acquired Madrid-based Everis, a company that provided IT services including consulting, system integration and outsourcing. Also in 2013, NTT DATA, the IT services provider with its U.S. headquarters in Plano, acquired Optimal Solutions Integration, a provider of SAP services headquartered in Irving, Texas. In 2015, the company acquired Carlisle & Gallagher, Inc., a Charlotte-based consulting firm. Also that year, the company acquired iPay88 - Online Payment Gateway for Asia Countries, Malaysia which specialize in online payment services and payment solutions for merchants with multiple financial institutions as business partners in Malaysia. In 2016, the company acquired the Dell IT Services unit (mainly the former Perot Systems) of Dell Inc for $3 billion. Also in 2016, the company acquired Nefos, a Salesforce consulting partner in Germany, Austria and Switzerland.

During the decade, NTT Data began sponsoring IndyCar Series team Chip Ganassi Racing. In 2019, the company became title sponsor of the series, dubbing it the NTT IndyCar Series.

in March 2022, NTT Data announced it had acquired the Detroit-based digital transformation and innovation company, Vectorform.

Operations 

Within the NTT group, while NTT Comware focuses on the IT services to the Group companies, NTT Data mainly services non-NTT Group companies. Within Japan, NTT DATA has established many joint ventures, such as NTT Data-Sanyo Electric to take care of the IT services of Sanyo electric group.  Outside Japan, NTT DATA has its wholly owned subsidiaries or offices in the UK, China, Malaysia, Thailand, India, the US, Italy, Australia, Singapore, Vietnam and other countries or regions. NTT DATA Business Solutions headquartered in Germany is a global acting subsidiary of NTT DATA with a 100 percent focus on SAP business. 

Yo Honma serves as President & CEO.

Products and services
Sponsored software:
 TOMOYO Linux (until March 2012)

Ticketing System
 Melbourne Australia myki

Awards

NTT DATA was ranked #8 in Consulting Magazine's 2016 Best Firms to Work For.

See also
List of IT consulting firms
Software industry in Telangana
Nippon Telegraph and Telephone (NTT) 
 NTT Communications (NTT Europe)
 NTT Comware
 NTT Data Engineering Systems Corporation
 NTT Docomo
 Data Analytics Library

References

External links
 NTT DATA Worldwide Website

Nippon Telegraph and Telephone
Service companies based in Tokyo
Telecommunications companies based in Tokyo
Companies listed on the Tokyo Stock Exchange
International information technology consulting firms
Japanese brands
Software companies based in Tokyo
Japanese companies established in 1988
Consulting firms established in 1988
Corporate spin-offs
Software companies established in 1988